Giacinto Artale (18 April 1906 – 30 May 1970) was an Italian politician belonging to the Christian Democracy party.

Artale was born in Ficarra.  He was elected a member of the Chamber of Deputies in 1948.

References

1906 births
1970 deaths
Politicians from the Province of Messina
Christian Democracy (Italy) politicians
Deputies of Legislature I of Italy